Bezerra River may refer to two rivers in Brazil:

 Bezerra River (Goiás)
 Bezerra River (Tocantins)

See also 
 Bezerra (disambiguation)